Geralyn White Dreyfous is an American film producer. She has produced multiple documentary and narrative films focusing on social justice issues including The Invisible War (2012), The Square (2013), The Hunting Ground (2015), Won't You Be My Neighbor? (2018), The Great Hack (2019), and On the Record (2020). Dreyfous has been nominated for Primetime Emmy awards.

Early life
Dreyfous Grew up in Groveland, Massachusetts.
Early in her career, she worked at The Philanthropic Initiative in Boston. She taught Documentary and Narrative writing with Dr. Robert Coles at Harvard University.

Career
Dreyfous is the chair and co-founder of the Utah Film Center, which provides funding to filmmakers. In 2007, Dreyfous co-founded Impact Partners, a documentary production company alongside Dan Cogan. In 2013, Dreyfous co-founded Gamechanger Films, a production company which only finances films directed by women.

Dreyfous has produced multiple films which have gone on to receive Academy Award and Emmy Award nominations. Including Born into Brothels (2005) directed by Zana Briski and Ross Kauffman, which won the Academy Award for Best Documentary Feature. The Invisible War (2012), directed by Kirby Dick, The Square (2013) directed by Jehane Noujaim, and The Hunting Ground (2015) directed by Kirby Dick.

Dreyfous has been nominated for two Primetime Emmy awards for producing Brave Miss World (2013), directed by Cecilia Peck, and The Great Hack (2019), directed by Jehane Noujaim and Karim Amer.

In 2013, Dreyfous was honored by the International Documentary Association with the Amicus Award. Additionally, Dreyfous was honored by Variety for the 2014 Women’s Impact Report.

In 2021, Dreyfous was nominated for a Peabody Award
as one of the executive producers of the docuseries Nuclear Family.

Filmography

Film

Television

See also

List of Academy Award records

References

External links
 

American documentary film producers
Year of birth missing (living people)
Living people
21st-century American women
American women documentary filmmakers